The 1949 Colgate Red Raiders football team was an American football team that represented Colgate University as an independent during the 1949 college football season. In its third season under head coach Paul Bixler, the team compiled a 1–8 record and was outscored by a total of 291 to 186. Warren Davis was the team captain. The team played its home games at Colgate Athletic Field in Hamilton, New York.

Schedule

References

Colgate
Colgate Raiders football seasons
Colgate Red Raiders football